Philip Lloyd (died 1735), of Grosvenor Street, Westminster, and Bardwin, Northumberland, was a British Army officer and politician who sat in the House of Commons between 1723 and 1735.

Lloyd was a Captain in Colonel Lucas's Foot in 1715. He was returned unopposed as Member of Parliament (MP)  for Saltash by Philip Wharton, 1st Duke of Wharton, at a by-election on 5 February 1723 after lavish entertainments which were never paid for. In 1724, he eloped with a Miss Cade, who had ‘£5,000 while he was relatively penniless. In 1726, he became captain in the 7th Dragoons.

Although Lloyd had been returned as an Opposition MP, he changed sides to support Walpole and sought financial assistance from Walpole at the 1727 British general election, when he was elected MP for Aylesbury. He went onto half pay in 1729 and was appointed equerry to George II in 1730, holding the post for the rest of his life. On his appointment, he had to stand for re-election at Aylesbury and lost his seat on 6 February 1730. 
 
Lloyd was returned unopposed as MP for Christchurch by the Administration at a by-election on 22 January 1732. At the 1734 British general election he was again returned unopposed by the Administration as MP for Lostwithiel. He voted with the Administration on every recorded occasion.

Lloyd died on 18 March 1735.

References

Year of birth missing
1735 deaths
Military personnel from Northumberland
People from Westminster
British MPs 1722–1727
British MPs 1727–1734
British MPs 1734–1741
Members of the Parliament of Great Britain for English constituencies
Members of the Parliament of Great Britain for constituencies in Cornwall